Jacob City is a city in Jackson County, Florida, United States. The population was 243 at the 2020 census.

Geography

Jacob City is located at  (30.894334, –85.409802).

Climate

Demographics

2020 census

As of the census of 2020, there were 243 people, 101 households, and 78 families residing in the city. The racial makeup of the city was 3.29% White and 90.95% African American.

There were 101 households, out of which 31.3% had children under the age of 18 living with them, 41.4% were married couples living together, 28.3% had a female householder with no husband present, and 25.3% were non-families. 22.2% of all households were made up of individuals, and 11.1% had someone living alone who was 65 years of age or older.  The average household size was 2.84 and the average family size was 3.36.

In the city, the population was spread out, with 30.6% under the age of 18, 7.8% from 18 to 24, 27.0% from 25 to 44, 20.6% from 45 to 64, and 13.9% who were 65 years of age or older.  The median age was 35 years. For every 100 females, there were 84.9 males.  For every 100 females age 18 and over, there were 66.7 males.

The median income for a household in the city was $26,583, and the median income for a family was $22,292. Males had a median income of $25,481 versus $25,875 for females. The per capita income for the city was $11,037.  About 24.7% of families and 26.0% of the population were below the poverty line, including 42.9% of those under the age of eighteen and 7.7% of those 65 or over.

History

Jacob City's history begins in the early 19th century, when many former slaves moved from Webbville to isolate themselves from harassment from the white people there, most of whose residents moved to Marianna in 1882. Webbville no longer exists, but was located around the current location of U.S. 231 and State Road 73. Marianna was known as the rich man's town and no Black people were welcome. The first known settlement of Jacob City was by a white man named Jacob Jones, who accepted Black people to be housed on his property. That is where Jacob City got its name, as they would tell their friends, "Let's go to Jacob's." As Black people arrived to escape oppression, they moved farther down and made horse wagon trails into dirt roads, forming a small community.

By the mid-19th century, the small town of Jacob was Jackson County's first Black community. Black people started their own store, but the owner was murdered and the store was never re-opened. By the late 19th century, St. Mary Missionary Baptist Church was built on what is now Main Street. It is commemorated by a Jacob City historical marker. By the early 20th century, Jacob's dirt roads were improved and its population rose, but the poverty level was high due to the lack of education, as there was no school for Black children.

St. Mary's Church provided a school, but many of its students never made it past seventh grade because they had to help with farm work at home with their parents. In 1953, St. Paul's school was established near Campbellton as an elementary and high school where Jacob children could get a better education. The Campbellton school lasted until 1972. In the late 20th century, Jacob modernized and joined the Florida League of Cities. In 1984, Jacob became Jacob City and built a town hall.

Transportation

Highways

 

 (Jacob Road)

References

Cities in Jackson County, Florida
Cities in Florida
Populated places established in 1984